McCowan is a terminal station on Line 3 Scarborough of the Toronto subway. It is located at 1275 McCowan Road, just north of Ellesmere Road at Bushby Drive/Town Centre Court. 

Both of the surface routes that pass the McCowan station also stop at Scarborough Centre station, located almost directly across McCowan Road, effectively leaving McCowan as a dead-end in the system.

The station is on three levels: Line 3 is on the upper floor, the automatic entrance from the Consilium Place office complex via the Pedway pedestrian walkway is on the second floor, and the station entrance from McCowan Road with the collector, and the concourse are on the lower floor.

In February 2021, the TTC recommended the closure of Line 3 in 2023 and its replacement by bus service until the completion of the Scarborough extension of Line 2 Bloor–Danforth. This closure would also include this station.

Rapid transit infrastructure in the vicinity
McCowan station is the terminus station of Line 3. Further east is McCowan Yard (completed in 1983), which stores the line's trains when they are not in service and can perform basic maintenance. For more complicated work, however, they are carried to the larger Greenwood Yard, which must be done by truck since there is no direct track connection.

There is a double crossover before the station entrance, but only one side of the station is in use. In earlier years both platforms were used for line-end and westbound trains, but the double crossover allows eastbound trains to cross over to the westbound platform, making for a more efficient system. The eastbound track is used when taking trains out of service. This allows the operator to ensure that the train will empty and no one will board before bringing the train to McCowan Yard.

Surface connections

Toronto Transit Commission 

A transfer is required to connect between the subway system and these surface routes:

TTC routes serving the station include:

Durham Region Transit 
On September 7, 2021, the Durham Region Transit launched a new regional route, 920, between McCowan subway station and Simcoe / Conlin, serving major destinations such as Centennial College Progress Campus, Ontario Tech University, Durham College, and the Amazon Fulfillment Centre in Ajax. The new bus route serves the station during weekday rush hours and weekend morning and early evening.

References

External links
 
 

Line 3 Scarborough stations
Railway stations in Canada opened in 1985